Soy gitano (I Am Gypsy) is a Spanish language television drama from Argentina.

Cast 
Osvaldo Laport as Amador Heredia - Brother of Lázaro, Josemi, and Maite, in love with Mora, then with Isabel
Arnaldo André as Lázaro Jesús Heredia - Eldest brother of Amador, Josemi, and Maite, father of Isabel
Juan Darthés as José Miguel 'Josemi' Heredia - Brother of Lázaro, Amador, and Maite, in love with Mora
Julieta Díaz as Mora Amaya - Daughter of Jano, sister of Ángel, and 'El Niño', in love with Amador, then with Josemi
Romina Gaetani as Isabel Salvatori - Daughter of Alba and Lázaro, in love with Amador
Valentina Bassias Luz Reyes - Wife of Ángel
Jorge Baldini as Diego Valdez Isabel's cousin, loves Brenda then Luz, Hates Angel and Sacho, has problems with them, and does not like Gypsies.
Betiana Blum as Alba Esther Soto - Mother of Isabel, sister of Amparo
Malena Solda as Maite Heredia - Sister of Lázaro, Amador, and Josemi, in love with 'El Niño'
Antonio Grimau as Jano F. Amaya - Father of Ángel, Mora, and 'El Niño', in love with Amparo
Joaquín Furriel as Rafael 'El Niño' Amaya - Son of Jano, brother of Ángel, and Mora, in love with Maite
Maximiliano Ghione as Silverio Soto - Nephew of Amparo and Alba
Luis Ziembrowski as Sacho - Worker of the Amaya's family
Toti Ciliberto as Walter Marcelo Barraza 'Tomate' - Husband of Vanina
Eugenia Guerty as Vanina Judith Trunsky - Friend of Isabel, wife of 'Tomate'
Luisina Brando as Amparo Jorgelina Soto - Wife of Lázaro, sister of Alba, in love with Jano

External links

Argentine telenovelas
2003 telenovelas
2004 telenovelas
Pol-ka telenovelas
Fictional representations of Romani people
Spanish-language telenovelas
2003 Argentine television series debuts
2004 Argentine television series endings